Annamayya is a 1997 Indian Telugu-language-language biographical film directed by K. Raghavendra Rao and produced by V. Doraswamy Raju under the VMC Productions banner. The film portrays the life of the 15th century composer Annamacharya, played by Nagarjuna who features alongside an ensemble cast including Mohan Babu, Suman, Ramya Krishna, Bhanupriya, Roja, and Kasthuri. The film has score and soundtrack composed by M. M. Keeravani.

Upon release, the film received positive reviews and won eight Nandi Awards, three Filmfare Awards and two National Film Awards. The film was featured at the 29th International Film Festival of India in the mainstream section.

Plot

Vishnu listens to requests from his consort Lakshmi, that there weren't many people singing songs in praise of the Lord.   In response, the Lord sends his sword Nandaka, to be born as Annamacharya (Annamayya) to a childless couple - Narayana Suri and Lakkamba in Tallapaka village, Kadapa District. Growing up as a normal young man, Annamayya loves his 2 cousins Timakka & Akkalamma who thinks that they are the most beautiful creations of God.

Lord Vishnu appears in front of Annamayya in disguise and accepts a challenge from him to show someone more beautiful than his cousins - God in the form of Lord Venkateswara in a temple in his village. Upon discovering the beauty of the Lord, Annamayya is lost in a different world and ends up making a pilgrimage to Tirumala Venkateswara Temple without planning or informing his parents. As he finds pilgrims entering the holy hills (Saptagiri- seven hills), he embarks on his journey towards Him. But, he is lost and is helped by Goddess Lakshmi herself in the form of an old lady by informs him that his footwear was preventing his progress. Also weakened by fasting, Annamayya accepts Laddu - a Prasadam from the food consecrated by the Lord himself. Upon reaching Tirumala, he is enthralled by the beauty of God and settles there to write and sing hymns in praise of the Lord.

Meanwhile, Annamayya's parents get worried regarding Annamayya's whereabouts. Then, the Lord Venkateshwara, hearing the prayers of Lakkavaamba (Annamayya's mother), himself comes in the disguise of a Hunter along with his consorts and tells them that Annamayya lives in Tirumala. Then, Annamayya's parents, cousins, aunt, uncle, and his 2 friends come to Tirumala and watch him worship the Lord.

When Annamayya is asked to marry his 2 cousins, he refuses saying that his life is dedicated to the service of the Lord and marriage would become a hindrance to it. But, he is then convinced by the Lord himself who has now taken the form of a Brahmin. The Lord personally conducts the wedding of Annamayya with his cousins - Timakka and Akkalamma. After the birth of the children, Annamayya settles in Tirumala leaving his children in the care of his parents. Through encounters with the local administrator (Tanikella Bharani), he comes in contact with the ruler of the country - Saluva Narasimha (Mohan Babu), who becomes a fan of his songs and makes him the court poet. On hearing a Sringara Sankeertan, the King and Queen (Roja) request that Annamayya sing a Sankeertan in their praise as well, something Annamayya rejects as he would sing only for the Lord and not for any human being. Jailed for not heeding the King, Annamayya invokes the Lord in the form of Narasimha (human-lion), and to the surprise of the King, jailors, and everyone - the iron rods burst into flames and release Annamayya.

Realizing that their husband was born for humanity and Lord's service, his wives give up their lives freeing Annamayya of any earthly attachment. Annamayya, realizing the divine order, takes to writing poems and Sankirtans and reaches old age. Priests and Brahmins unhappy with his social inclusion of lower caste people in the temple try to destroy his writings. When Annamayya decides to sacrifice his life because all his works were lost, a significant portion of his work is saved by Lord's grace from the fire. Saluva Narasimha and Annamayya's sons convert his work from palm to copper inscriptions thus preserving his works for eternity. On completion and dedication of the work in the temple sanctum sanctorum, the Lord and his consorts appear one last time, in their divine form. The Lord grants salvation and Annamayya's soul returns as Nandaka.

Cast

 Nagarjuna as Annamayya
 Suman as Lord Venkateshwara
 Mohan Babu as Saluva Narasimha Rayalu
 Bhanupriya as Goddess Padmavati
 Ramya Krishna as Timakka
 Kasthuri as Akkalamma
 Roja as Saluva Narasimha Rayalu's wife
 Sri Kanya as Goddess Bhoodevi
 M. Balayya as Narayana Suri
 Subha as Lakkamamba
 Kota Srinivasa Rao
 Brahmanandam as Pandit
 Babu Mohan
 Tanikella Bharani
 Mallikarjuna Rao
 AVS
 Gundu Hanumantha Rao
 Chitti Babu
 Ananth Babu
 Suthi Velu
 Jenny
 "Fight Master" Raju
 Siva Parvathi

Reception

Though there have been few changes in the original life history of Shri Tallapaka Annamacharya, one could understand these changes helped the movie to become commercially a big hit.

Soundtrack

Music released on T-Series Audio company. The audio was initially released in two volumes (Vol. 1 & Vol. 2) in the Audio cassette format. The film album is the highest sold Telugu music album till date.

Box-office
The film turned out to be a hit with a 100-day run in 42 centres. The film had a 176-day run in 2 centres. The film was a big hit in Chennai too.

The film was dubbed into Tamil as Annamacharya, into Malayalam as Annamacharya and in Hindi as  Tirupathi Sri Balaji.

Awards
45th National Film Awards
 Best Music Direction - M. M. Keeravani
 Special Mention (actor) - Nagarjuna

Filmfare Awards South
 Best Film – Telugu - V. Doraswamy Raju Raju
 Best Director – Telugu - K. Raghavendra Rao
 Best Actor – Telugu - Nagarjuna

Nandi Awards - 1997
 Best Feature Film - Gold - V. Doraswamy Raju
 Best Director - K. Raghavendra Rao
 Best Actor - Nagarjuna
 Best Male Dubbing Artist - S. P. Balasubrahmanyam
 Best Costume Designer - Thota Babu Rao
 Best Makeup Artist - T. Mallikarjuna Rao
 Best Art Director - V. Bhaskara Raju
 Best Cinematographer - A. Vincent

References

External links
 

1997 films
1990s Telugu-language films
Indian biographical films
Films directed by K. Raghavendra Rao
Indian musical films
Indian epic films
Films about classical music and musicians
Films scored by M. M. Keeravani
Hindu devotional films
1990s biographical films
1997 musical films